Laurent Levy (born 1971) is a French physical chemist, inventor, and pioneer of nanotechnology and nanomedicine. He is the co-founder of the global biotechnology company Nanobiotix, and has served as chief executive officer (CEO) since its inception in March 2003. He also authored more than 35 international scientific publications and has applied for several patents.

Early life and education 
Laurent Levy was born on the outskirts of northern-east Paris, France, in Montreuil.

After high school, Laurent went on to study biology at Pierre and Marie Curie University (Paris VI). He changed his area of study to biophysics then to physics and chemistry after two years, graduating with his bachelor's degree in 1994. He then earned his master's degree (DEA) in physics of condensed matter from UPVI-ESPCI.

Laurent attended Paris VI and the CEA for doctoral studies in physical chemistry, specializing in nanomaterials. His doctoral thesis centered on quantum confinement as it relates to magnetic semiconductors.

Following the receipt of his doctorate, Levy completed a postdoctoral fellowship with Prof. Paras N. Prasad at the Institute for Lasers, Photonics, and Biophotonics at SUNY Buffalo in the United States.

Work 
In 2003, Levy founded Nanobiotix to create a medical treatment using the techniques he developed at SUNY Buffalo. Nanobiotix would build on his work to develop what is now known as NBTXR3, a first-in-class “radioenhancer” designed to significantly increase the efficacy of radiation therapy without increasing negative side effects associated with radiation. In 2011, Nanobiotix treated its first patient using NBTXR3.  In 2018 the results of a phase III clinical trial established that this new type of product could work in humans. In 2019 the company received approval to sell NBTXR3 in Europe under the brand name Hensify® for the treatment of soft tissue sarcomas of the extremities and trunk wall.
In 2015 Levy joined the board of biotech startup Valbiotis, the first company to register a nutraceutical based on clinical findings. The company develops nutraceutical products for the prevention of diabetes in pre-diabetics. Levy helped take Valbiotis public in 2018.

In 2019, Levy co-founded the biotechnology company Curadigm as a spin-off from Nanobiotix. Curadigm's lead technology is a nanoprimer that affects liver function, reducing its ability to filter out drugs, making drug delivery more efficacious.

European nanomedicine advocacy 

As Nanobiotix grew, Levy became increasingly frustrated at the struggles nanomedicine companies faced in gaining visibility and support in the European Union. To advocate for nanomedical development, Levy joined the European Technology Platform Nanomedicine (ETPN) in 2012 and was elected Vice President.
Levy is a founding member of the ETPN Translation Advisory Board, which has supported 109 European biotech entrepreneurs in launching their companies. Levy also helped to establish the ETPN's Nanomedicine Translation Hub, which advises SMEs, Startups, Academics and Inventors on how to bring their nanomedicine projects to the market.

Awards and recognition 
 2019 Prix Galien
 2018 
 CPhI Pharma Award - Excellence in Pharma: CEO of the year Laurent Levy 
 CPhI Pharma Award - Pharma Company of the year : Nanobiotix
European Business Award 2018 : The award for Innovation
 2016 European Mediscience Award: Best technology Award
 2015 Prix de la relation actionnaires
 2013 University of Buffalo Young Entrepreneurs Prize : Laurent Levy
 2006 Paris Bio Prize
 2003 Inventor of the year: Niagara frontier intellectual property law association

External links 

 Ted Talk

Patents 

NANOBIOTIX CORE TECHNOLOGY
ACTIVATABLE PARTICLES
NANOPARTICLE DELIVERY SYSTEMS, PREPARATION AND USES THEREOF
NANOPARTICLES COMPRISING METALLIC AND HAFNIUM OXIDE MATERIALS, PREPARATION AND USES THEREOF 
INORGANIC NANOPARTICLES COMPOSITIONS IN COMBINATION WITH IONIZING RADIATIONS FOR TREATING CANCER
COMPOSITIONS AND METHODS FOR USE IN MEDICAL DIAGNOSIS
COMPOSITIONS AND METHODS FOR USE IN ONCOLOGY
PHARMACEUTICAL COMPOSITION COMPRISING NANOPARTICLES, PREPARATION AND USES THEREOF
NANOPARTICLES FOR USE AS A THERAPEUTIC VACCINE
METALLIC NANOPARTICLES, PREPARATION AND USES THEREOF
WO/2014/191569:  PHARMACEUTICAL COMPOSITION, PREPARATION AND USES THEREOF
PHARMACEUTICAL COMPOSITION COMBINING AT LEAST TWO DISTINCT NANOPARTICLES AND A PHARMACEUTICAL COMPOUND, PREPARATION AND USES THEREOF
NANOPARTICLES FOR USE FOR TREATING A NEURONAL DISORDER
NANOPARTICLES FOR USE FOR ENHANCING BRAIN PERFORMANCES OR FOR TREATING STRESS
COATED NANOPARTICLES FOR USE FOR MODULATING ELECTRICAL POLARIZATION OF NEURONS
NANOPARTICLES FOR USE FOR TREATING A NEURONAL DISORDER

Publications

References

French physical chemists
Pierre and Marie Curie University alumni
French chief executives
French healthcare chief executives
French nanotechnologists
1971 births
Living people
University at Buffalo alumni